The Second Cabinet of President Muhammadu Buhari consists of the ministers appointed in the Buhari Administration to take responsibility for each of the government ministries of Nigeria following the 2019 elections. Most ministers were sworn in on 21 August 2019.

Formation
Similarly to his first cabinet formation, Buhari delayed appointing a cabinet until later in the year, much to the chagrin of pundits and economists who said that the delay was hurting policy development and economic growth.

On 11 November, a cabinet of 43 ministers from each of the 36 states of Nigeria was sworn in. The list did not contain over a dozen ministers that were in Buhari's first cabinet while including numerous former governors. The new cabinet was criticized for its decline in gender diversity (with only seven women compared to fifteen at the start of the last cabinet) and preference for political allies over technocrats.

Cabinet of Nigeria

See also
Cabinet of Nigeria
Federal government of Nigeria

Notes

References

Muhammadu Buhari 2
Government of Nigeria
Politics of Nigeria
Buhari